is the 2nd single released by the Japanese pop duo Puffy AmiYumi on October 7, 1996. It sold over 1.5 million copies and was their first #1 hit.  They won "Japan Record Award for Best New Artist" in 1996.

It is known in American releases as being titled '"That's The Way It Is"' in An Illustrated History and the album Hi Hi Puffy AmiYumi, although not a direct translation of the song title.

A Mandarin version of the song was released as a single in China and Taiwan in late 1998 and can be found on their compilation album The Very Best of Puffy/amiyumi Jet Fever. A remix of this version is also on their 2003 remix album PRMX Turbo.

Track listing

"Kore ga Watashi no Ikirumichi" (Monaural)
"Yuki ga Furu Machi" (Unicorn cover)
"Kore ga Watashi no Ikirumichi" (Stereo Karaoke)
"Yuki ga Furu Machi" (Original Karaoke)

Phrases and harmonies
"Kore ga Watashi no Ikirumichi" is filled with phrases and harmonies of The Beatles and The Who.

In 2012, Tamio Okuda explained it in the magazine PEN'''s interview featured the Beatles:
"I thought it would be fun if women played a song as a parody of the Beatles a little bit. If I played it, it would only become a song that was merely parodied by the man who liked the Beatles. But I thought it would be OK if Puffy played it."
()

Chart performance
The song became the first Puffy single to debut at number 1, selling 402,920 copies that week (until date, Puffy's biggest first-week sales of a single); the track stayed for another two weeks at the top of the chart and became Puffy's longest reign at number one, selling 735,230 copies only in its first three weeks; it stayed nine non-consecutive weeks at the top 10. The song remained for 16 weeks on the chart and sold 1,566,060 copies, Puffy's biggest selling single. On the J-Wave chart, the song debuted at number 85 and in its fifth week peaked at number 12; it remained on the chart for 20 weeks, Puffy's longest run on the chart.

Oricon Sales Chart

J-Wave Airplay Chart

Certifications

In popular culture
"Kore ga watashi no ikiru michi" was featured in the Japan-only games  Donkey Konga 3 and Rayman Raving Rabbids 2. Called Rabbids Party Returns
 A chiptune rendition also appeared in the Japan-only Sega Pico game Minna de Karaoke! Issho ni Utaou Suki na Uta!.
 The song also featured in the pilot episode of the television series Heroes and a remix appeared in the French/Japanese action film Wasabi.
Parts of the song were notable for being used in a 1996 commercial for Japanese brand Tessera 'Juicy-Juicy' shampoo.
 The song was used for the ending theme of the anime television adaptation of ReLIFE, Episode 05, "Overlap", in July, 2016 and for the opening theme of the anime movie Sound! Euphonium—Our Promise: A Brand New Day''.

References

External links
DISCOGRAPHY: . PUFFY Official Website.
Tessera Commercial on YouTube
English lyrics of this song

Puffy AmiYumi songs
1996 singles
Oricon Weekly number-one singles
1996 songs